Prelog is a settlement on the left bank of the Kamnik Bistrica River southeast of Domžale and north of Ihan in the Upper Carniola region of Slovenia.

References

External links

Prelog on Geopedia

Populated places in the Municipality of Domžale